Vay Arkadaş is a 2010 Turkish comedy film directed by Kemal Uzun.

Cast 
 Ali Atay as Manik
 Mete Horozoğlu as Dildo
 Fırat Tanış as Tik
 Demet Evgar as Nil
 Rasim Öztekin as Efendi Baba
 Mustafa Üstündağ as Sadık
 Erdal Tosun as Halit Aga
  as Sezai

References

External links 

2010 action comedy films
2010 films
Turkish action comedy films
2010 comedy films